Kevin Corbin is a Republican member of the North Carolina Senate, having represented the 50th district since 2021. Corbin previously served 2 terms in the North Carolina House of Representatives, representing the 120th district from 2017 to 2021. An insurance executive from Franklin, North Carolina, he also served as a member of the Macon County board of commissioners from 2011 to 2016 and served 20 years on the Macon County School Board.

Political positions
Corbin supports Medicaid expansion, one of the first Republicans in the North Carolina General Assembly to do so. During the 2021-2022 session, Corbin and Sen. Jim Burgin announced they were working on a bill to expand coverage to 12 months for new mothers. The bill was referred to Approriations where it was approved and signed by the Governor.

Electoral history

2020

2018

2016

References

External links
Campaign Website

|-

Living people
Republican Party members of the North Carolina House of Representatives
Republican Party North Carolina state senators
Appalachian State University alumni
21st-century American politicians
People from Macon County, North Carolina
Year of birth missing (living people)